The 2nd Assembly District of Wisconsin is one of 99 districts in the Wisconsin State Assembly. Located in northeast Wisconsin, the district comprises most of northern Manitowoc County, including the city of Two Rivers, as well as most of the southern half of Brown County, including most of the city of De Pere.  The district is represented by Republican Shae Sortwell, since January 2019.

The 2nd Assembly district is located within Wisconsin's 1st Senate district, along with the 1st and 3rd Assembly districts.

History

The district was created in the 1972 redistricting act (1971 Wisc. Act 304) which first established the numbered district system, replacing the previous system which allocated districts to specific counties.  The 2nd district was drawn to combine the previous Manitowoc County 1st district (the city of Manitowoc) with municipalities of southeastern Manitowoc County which had been part of the Manitowoc County 2nd district. Donald K. Helgeson, the last representative of the Manitowoc 1st district, was defeated in the 1972 election to represent the new 2nd Assembly district.

The 2nd district boundaries have remained relatively consistent in redistricting since 1983—based in northern Manitowoc and southern Brown counties, with a slight shuffling of municipalities in each decennial map.  The 1983 redistricting act superseded a 1982 court-ordered redistricting plan which scrambled State Assembly districts and moved the 2nd district to Milwaukee County for the 1983–1984 legislative session.

List of past representatives

Electoral history

References 

Wisconsin State Assembly districts
Brown County, Wisconsin
Manitowoc County, Wisconsin